The 2010 Cork Senior Hurling Championship was the 122nd staging of the Cork Senior Hurling Championship since its establishment by the Cork County Board in 1887. The draw for the 2010 opening round fixtures took place on 13 December 2009. The championship began on 1 May 2010 and ended on 10 October 2010.

Newtownshandrum were the defending champions, however, they were defeated by Erin's Own in the quarter-finals.

On 29 August 2010, Blarney were relegated from the championship following a 1-14 to 1-12 defeat by Blackrock.

On 10 October 2010, Sarsfields won the championship following a 1-17 to 0-18 defeat of Glen Rovers in the final. This was their fourth championship title overall and their first in two championship seasons.

Team changes

To Championship

Promoted from the Cork Premier Intermediate Hurling Championship
 Douglas

From Championship

Relegated to the Cork Premier Intermediate Hurling Championship
 Castlelyons

Results

Divisions/colleges section

Round 1

Round 2

Round 3

Relegation play-off

Round 4

Quarter-finals

Semi-finals

Final

Championship statistics

Scoring statistics

Top scorers overall

Top scorers in a single game

Miscellaneous

 Douglas reached the semi-final stages of the championship for the first time ever.
 Glen Rovers qualified for the final for the first time since 1991.

References

Cork Senior Hurling Championship
Cork Senior Hurling Championship